The 55th Infantry Division (55-ya Pekhotnaya Diviziya) was an infantry formation of the Russian Imperial Army.

Organization
1st Brigade
217th Infantry Regiment
218th Infantry Regiment
2nd Brigade
219th Infantry Regiment
220th Infantry Regiment
55th Artillery Brigade

Commanders

Chiefs of Staff

References

Infantry divisions of the Russian Empire